The 17415 / 16 Haripriya Express is an Express train belonging to Indian Railways – South Central Railway zone that runs between  & Shri Chhatrapati Shahu Maharaj Terminus, Kolhapur in India.

It operates as train number 17415 from Tirupati to Shri Chhatrapati Shahu Maharaj Terminus and as train number 17416 in the reverse direction, serving the states of Andhra Pradesh, Karnataka & Maharashtra. It is named after goddess Mahalakshmi who is the consort of Venkateshwara in Tirupati.

Coaches

The 17415 / 16 Haripriya Express has 1 AC First Class cum AC 2 tier, 1 AC 2 tier, 2 AC 3 tier, 13 Sleeper class, 2 General Unreserved & 2 SLR (Seating cum Luggage Rake) coaches. It does not carry a pantry car.

As is customary with most train services in India, coach composition may be amended at the discretion of Indian Railways depending on demand.

Service

Routeing

The 17415 / 16 Haripriya Express runs from Tirupati via , Gooty, Belgaum,  to Shri Chhatrapati Shahu Maharaj Terminus.

It reverses direction of travel at Miraj Junction.

Traction

As the route is undergoing electrification, it is hauled by a Lallaguda-based WAP-4 from Tirupati up to  handing over to a Gooty or Krishnarajapuram-based WDP-4 or WDP-4D locomotive for the remainder of the journey until Shri Chhatrapati Shahu Maharaj Terminus .

Rake sharing

It shares its rake with the 17411 / 12 Mahalaxmi Express.

See also

Dedicated Intercity trains of India

References

External links

Transport in Tirupati
Transport in Kolhapur
Railway services introduced in 1998
Named passenger trains of India
Rail transport in Maharashtra
Rail transport in Karnataka
Rail transport in Andhra Pradesh
Express trains in India